Hexie or He Xie may refer to:
 Harmonious Society, Chinese leader Hu Jintao's signature ideology
 Hexie (train) (meaning "Harmony") - Chinese name of China Railway High-speed trains
 River crab (Internet slang)

See also
 Xie He (artist), Chinese painter and art theorist in the 6th century
 Xie He (Go player), Chinese Go player